Yala Hospital is the main hospital of Yala Province, Thailand. It is classified under the Ministry of Public Health as a regional hospital. It has a CPIRD Medical Education Center which trains doctors for the Faculty of Medicine, Prince of Songkla University. It is also an affiliated teaching hospital of the Faculty of Medicine, Princess of Naradhiwas University.

History 
In 1942, following the establishment of the Ministry of Public Health, the policy of constructing hospitals in all provinces was initiated. Towards the end of 1948, Yala Health Station was elevated to hospital status as Yala Hospital, with its official opening on 1 January 1949. It reached regional hospital status on 15 July 1987. The hospital has an agreement to train medical students and act as a clinical teaching hospital with the Faculty of Medicine, Prince of Songkla University under the Collaborative Project to Increase Production of Rural Doctors (CPIRD) program.

Yala Hospital is the largest tertiary care referral hospital for injuries from the South Thailand insurgency within the three provinces of Pattani, Yala and Narathiwat where the conflict is most concentrated.

See also 

 Healthcare in Thailand
 Hospitals in Thailand
 List of hospitals in Thailand

References 

Hospitals in Thailand
Yala province